Anna Borysivna Sharyhina (born c.1978) is a Ukrainian feminist and LGBT activist. She is a cofounder of the Sphere Women's Association, a lesbian feminist organisation in Kharkiv, and of the NGO Kyiv Pride, the organizing committee of the Pride Parade in Kyiv.

Sharyhina and her partner, Vira Chemygina, have been involved in the Ukrainian LGBT community and lesbian organizations for over a decade. They organized Kyiv's first walks for equality. Kyiv's second walk for equality, held in 2015, was accompanied by police and had the support of a range of public figures. However, the march only lasted 15 minutes because of extreme-right violence against the marchers. Ten people, including police officers guarding the event, were injured.

Sharyhina's feminist and LGBT activity has faced continued opposition in Ukraine. When she gave a lecture on LGBT movements at a Kharkiv bookstore, the meeting needed to be relocated twice: first to Kharkiv’s Nakipelo press centre and then to Kyiv’s Izolyatsiya centre. PrideHub, a Kharkiv community center, was attacked by masked men with smoke grenades in July 2018; the building was later vandalised with graffiti and animal blood. Though complaints were made to police, and over 1,000 letters of complaint addressed to Interior Minister Arsen Avakov, nobody has been punished for the offence.<ref name=Nemtsova>Anna Nemtsova, Mike Pompeo Snubs Ukraine’s Embattled LGBTQ Community, The Daily Beast, Jan 31, 2020.</ref>

In March 2019 Sharyhina was amongst those organizing a Week of Women's Solidarity in Kharkiv for the first week of March:

In January 2020 Sharyhina criticized (then) United States Secretary of State Mike Pompeo for visiting Ukraine without meeting LGBTQ community leaders.

See also
LGBT rights in Ukraine

References

External links
 Story no.11. Anna Sharyhina, Gay Alliance Ukraine'', Nov 25, 2015.
 Chanelle Grand, Portrait : Anna Sharyhina, militante et directrice de la marche de la fierté LGBT en Ukraine, STOP Homophobie, 5 October 2015.
 Hanna Sokolova, anna-sharyhina-interview-en/ “When we compromise, it’s as if we admit we’re not equal”: Anna Sharyhina on feminism and LGBT rights in Ukraine, openDemocracy, 22 May 2019.

1978 births
Year of birth uncertain
Living people
Ukrainian feminists
Ukrainian LGBT rights activists
Ukrainian LGBT people
21st-century LGBT people